Teachers is an American television sitcom on TV Land that aired from 2016 through 2019. It is based on the web series of the same name by the improv group The Katydids (all members of the group by coincidence have the first name Kate as a root name), and is written by the six members of the group who also play teachers at the Chicago-area Fillmore Elementary School.
The series' initial 10 episodes premiered on January 13, 2016. On March 3, 2016, TV Land renewed Teachers for a 20-episode second season, which premiered on January 17, 2017. On March 21, 2017, the series went on hiatus, with the final 10 episodes of season two beginning to air on November 7, 2017. On April 20, 2017, the show was renewed for a 20-episode third season, which premiered on June 5, 2018. On November 20, 2018, TV Land announced that the series would end after three seasons and 50 episodes. The series finale aired on March 19, 2019.

Premise
The series follows the lives, interactions and challenges of six female teachers at the fictional Millard Fillmore Elementary School in suburban Chicago.

Cast

Main

 Caitlin Barlow as Cecilia Cannon, the school's art teacher who is very liberal and frequently tries to rally the others to join protests or support causes
 Katy Colloton as Chelsea Snap, an extremely narcissistic teacher who sleeps around and is obsessed with her looks
 Cate Freedman as Anna Jane "AJ" Feldman (seasons 1-2, guest season 3), a somewhat lazy teacher whose classes are frequently out of control. She often makes reference to using a variety of drugs.
 Kate Lambert as Caroline Watson, a relatively competent teacher who is a hopeless romantic, which causes her to sometimes lose perspective
 Katie O’Brien as Mary Louise Bennigan, an extremely religious, conservative teacher who is depicted as somewhat naïve. Despite their being polar opposites, she considers Chelsea to be her best friend and puts her on a pedestal.
 Kathryn Renée Thomas as Deb Adler, an antisocial, often angry teacher who was an outcast back in her own school days. Due to overcrowding, she must teach her class in a mobile home-like outbuilding. She is married to an unsuccessful musician.

Recurring
 Tim Bagley as Principal Toby Pearson
 Ryan Caltagirone as James "Hot Dad" Colton
 Eugene Cordero as Marty Crumbs
 Trevor Larcom as Blake Colton
 Zackary Arthur as David
 Cheyenne Nguyen as Beth
 Lulu Wilson as Annie
 Siena Agudong as Tiffany
 Nicolas Hedges as Peter
 Mataeo Mingo as Brad
 Haley Joel Osment as Damien Adler
 Jay Martel as Mr. Spinnoli
 Richard T. Jones as Frank Humphrey
 Ryan Hansen as Brent 
 Patricia Belcher as Mavis
 David Wain as Pastor Ted
 Adam Korson as Kyle

Development and production
Teachers is based on the web series of the same name, created by and starring improv group The Katydids. The series was originally conceived as webisodes, directed by Matt Miller and produced by Cap Gun TV, a development/production studio based in Chicago and Los Angeles.

TV Land ordered a pilot on March 19, 2014, with The Katydids reprising their roles from the web series.
Alison Brie executive produces alongside The Katydids, Matt Miller, and Cap Gun TV. Ian Roberts and Jay Martel have signed on as showrunners, with Richie Keen directing the series' pilot.
TV Land picked up the show to series on October 1, 2014 with a 10-episode order.

Episodes

Release
The first episode was released on demand on December 15, 2015, before the broadcast debut on January 13, 2016.

Internationally, the series premiered in Australia on The Comedy Channel on October 24, 2016.

It premiered on Comedy Central UK on 7 November 2016.

Critical reception
Teachers has received positive reviews from critics. Rotten Tomatoes awarded the series with a rating of 75% based on reviews from 13 critics and an average rating of 5.9 out of 16. The site's critical consensus reads: "Teachers struggles with the transition from web series to television, but gets some good marks for humor." On Metacritic, the series received a score of 66% based on reviews from 10 critics, indicating "generally favorable reviews".

References

External links
 
 

2010s American school television series
2010s American single-camera sitcoms
2010s American workplace comedy television series
2016 American television series debuts
2019 American television series endings
Elementary school television series
English-language television shows
Narcissism in television
TV Land original programming
Television series about educators
Television series based on Internet-based works
Television shows set in Illinois